Abraham Maus Schermerhorn (December 11, 1791 – August 22, 1855) was the third mayor of Rochester, New York and a United States Representative from New York.

Early life
He was born in 1791 in Schenectady. He completed preparatory studies and graduated from Union College in 1810. He studied law, was admitted to the bar in 1812, and in 1813, he moved to Rochester.

Political career
He became the "money king" of the Genesee region as the secretary of Rochester's first bank, before becoming a supervisor of the city in 1834.

In 1837, he became the third mayor of Rochester but resigned after two months to become secretary to the New York State Senate. He became a member of the New York State Assembly (Monroe Co., 2nd D.) in 1848, and was elected as a Whig to the Thirty-first and Thirty-second Congresses, representing New York's 28th congressional district holding office from March 4, 1849, to March 3, 1853.

Personal life
Schermerhorn was married to Mary Kent Adams (1798–1865). Together, they were the parents of:

 Susan M. Schermerhorn (d. 1846)
 James Adams Schermerhorn (1816–1879), who married Sarah Maria Parker (1819–1874) in 1849.

In 1855, he died in Savin Rock, near West Haven, Connecticut. He was interred in Mount Hope Cemetery, Rochester.

References

External links

 
 Schermerhorn Genealogy and Family Chronicles at www.SchenectadyHistory.org

1791 births
1855 deaths
Abraham M.
American people of Dutch descent
Burials at Mount Hope Cemetery (Rochester)
Politicians from Schenectady, New York
Union College (New York) alumni
Mayors of Rochester, New York
Members of the New York State Assembly
Whig Party members of the United States House of Representatives from New York (state)
19th-century American politicians
New York (state) Republicans